Elsabe Natasha Ntlangwini (née Louw) is a South African politician. A member of the Economic Freedom Fighters, she has served as a Member of the National Assembly of South Africa since May 2014.

Early life and education
Ntlangwini was born in Pearston in the Cape Province. Her father worked as a boilermaker, while her mother was employed as a cook at a boarding school. In 2002, she matriculated from Parkdene High School. She completed a one-year course on quality control through the University of South Africa.

Political career
Ntlangwini was involved in both the ANC's youth league and women's league. In 2013, she joined the Economic Freedom Fighters after she resigned from her job. The next year, she was elected to the National Assembly as a party representative. She was re-elected in 2019.

Personal life
Ntlanwini is married to Sivuyile. In January 2020, she gave birth to her fourth daughter.

References

External links
Mrs Elsabe Natasha Ntlangwini at Parliament of South Africa

Living people
Year of birth missing (living people)
People from the Eastern Cape
Economic Freedom Fighters politicians
Members of the National Assembly of South Africa
Women members of the National Assembly of South Africa